The Journal of Bioinformatics and Computational Biology was founded in 2003 and is published by World Scientific. The journal covers analysis of cellular information, especially in the technical aspect. The managing editor is Limsoon Wong (National University of Singapore).

Abstracting and indexing 
The journal is abstracted and indexed in:

 Index Medicus
 BIOSIS Previews
 Biological Abstracts
 MEDLINE
 CompuScience
 Scopus
 Inspec

English-language journals
Publications established in 2003
Bioinformatics and computational biology journals
World Scientific academic journals